The following is a detailed list of results and scores from National Football League games aired on NBC under the game package NBC Sunday Night Football. The list includes both regular season and post-season game results, both produced by NBC Sports, from the 2006 NFL season to the present.

The NFL instated a new "flex-scheduling" policy in which the NFL could choose a game to be aired in primetime on NBC based on the team's current performance and record. Previously, Sunday night NFL games were televised by ESPN, from 1987–2005, and TNT, from 1990–1997.

Starting with the 2006 NFL season, NBC was awarded the rights to air Sunday night primetime American football games, as well as the rights to air two games of the NFL playoffs. In February 2009, NBC concluded their third season of the game package by broadcasting Super Bowl XLIII and the 2009 Pro Bowl from Honolulu, Hawai'i. The game package also includes broadcast rights to the NFL Kickoff Game, the late-night Thanksgiving game, and Pro Football Hall of Fame Game.

Results by season
Listed below are games and their respective results played from 2006—present.

2000s

2006

In 2006, NBC Sunday Night Football wrapped up its inaugural season averaging 17.5 million viewers, 1.2 million viewers better than Monday Night Football in 2005 on ABC and the best viewership number for the network primetime NFL package in six years (18.5 million on ABC in 2000). The season featured pop singer Pink singing the anthem for SNF called "I've Been Waiting All Day For Sunday Night."  This would be the only season the tentatively scheduled games during the flex period were not publicly announced.

The September 10 game marked the first time two brothers started against each other as quarterbacks: Peyton Manning of the Indianapolis Colts, and Eli Manning of the New York Giants.

There was no game played on October 22 because it overlapped with Game 1 of the 2006 World Series between the St. Louis Cardinals and the Detroit Tigers, along with Christmas Eve night; NBC broadcast the latter week's game (Philadelphia Eagles at Dallas Cowboys) on Christmas afternoon instead. However, the broadcast of Football Night in America continued at its regular time on both occasions each Sunday, with a half-hour version of the program airing before the Christmas game and the two "Wild Card Saturday" games.

2007

In 2007, there was no game broadcast on October 28 due to Game 4 of the 2007 World Series between the Boston Red Sox and the Colorado Rockies, although Football Night in America aired at its usual time that week. Also, a tentative full-season schedule was unveiled, including games in the last seven weeks of the season. Those games could be replaced under flexible scheduling if the need arose. Three of the games in the last seven weeks were eventually replaced with more compelling matches. This resulted in the situation—twice—of having a team playing consecutive Sunday nights. The New England Patriots played consecutive Sunday nights: their November 18 game at the Buffalo Bills was moved to prime time, replacing the Chicago Bears at Seattle Seahawks game, and was subsequently followed on November 25 by their already scheduled home game against the Philadelphia Eagles. Likewise, the Washington Redskins played a scheduled game at the New York Giants on December 16, and their December 23 game at the Minnesota Vikings was moved to prime time, replacing the Tampa Bay Buccaneers at San Francisco 49ers game. Also, due to playoff implications, the December 30 Tennessee Titans at Indianapolis Colts game was flexed to prime time, replacing the Kansas City Chiefs at New York Jets game. Thus, the Colts played in the Kickoff game against the New Orleans Saints (due to winning Super Bowl XLI) and the regular season finale. The same rules under which CBS and Fox protected games for their own packages still applied.

*Bears-Seahawks game was flexed out for the Patriots-Bills game. 
**Buccaneers-49ers game was flexed out for the Redskins-Vikings game. 
***Chiefs-Jets game was flexed out for the Titans-Colts game.

2008

NBC Sunday Night Football's 2008 schedule began on September 4 with the defending Super Bowl champion New York Giants defeating the Washington Redskins in the NFL Kickoff game. On September 7, the Indianapolis Colts hosted the Chicago Bears in the first game at Lucas Oil Stadium. 2008 marked the third consecutive year that both the Colts and Giants would be featured in the NBC Sunday Night Football opening week games. As a result, the Manning brothers were used in commercial advertisements.

The 2008 schedule, released April 15, continued the current practice of a scheduled game possibly being moved in favor of a more compelling one during Weeks 11 through 16 (November 16 through December 21), but left the slot open on the final Sunday, December 28. The NFL Kickoff Game between the Redskins and Giants that was played on September 4 started at 7:00 p.m. instead of the normal 8:30 p.m. time in order to avoid conflict with the nomination speech that John McCain gave at the 2008 Republican National Convention that night; the game ended at 10:01pm EDT, averting any conflict. As in previous years, one Sunday night (October 26) featured no game broadcast due to Game 4 of the 2008 World Series between the Tampa Bay Rays and the Philadelphia Phillies, although Football Night in America aired as usual that week.

The October 19 Seattle Seahawks-Tampa Bay Buccaneers game featured Cris Collinsworth substituting for John Madden as the color commentator, the first time Madden had missed calling a game in 28 years. He had taken the week off because he would have had to make three straight cross country trips after calling games in Jacksonville and San Diego. (He travels by bus because of a fear of flying.) The New England Patriots-Seattle Seahawks game on December 7 was dropped in favor of a Washington Redskins-Baltimore Ravens flex schedule game. The San Diego Chargers-Tampa Bay Buccaneers game on December 21 was dropped in favor of a Carolina Panthers-New York Giants game to determine home-field advantage in the NFC playoffs. The Week 17 game was purposely not chosen when the schedule was initially released, and the Denver Broncos-San Diego Chargers game was picked up for it to determine the winner of the AFC West division.

On Wild Card weekend, the Atlanta Falcons and Arizona Cardinals both made their debuts on SNF in the 4:30 EDT game on January 3. The San Diego Chargers hosted the Indianapolis Colts in the primetime game later that evening.

Super Bowl XLIII, the first aired as part of this package took place on February 1 in Raymond James Stadium, with the Pittsburgh Steelers defeating the Arizona Cardinals 27–23.

*Patriots-Seahawks game was flexed out for the Redskins-Ravens game. 
**Chargers-Buccaneers game was flexed out for the Panthers-Giants game.

2009

*Patriots-Dolphins game was flexed out for the Vikings-Cardinals game.

2010s

2010

*Chargers-Bengals game was flexed out for the Vikings-Eagles game. The game was played on Tuesday night due to the December 2010 North American blizzard.

2011

*Colts–Patriots game was flexed out for the Lions-Saints game.

2012
The December 16 game between the San Francisco 49ers and New England Patriots was interrupted for 25 minutes for NBC to cover President Barack Obama's speech in reaction to the Sandy Hook Elementary School shooting the previous Friday. Coverage aired on NBC Sports Network and CNBC until the speech ended, after which NBC resumed airing the game.

*Chargers-Jets game was flexed out for the 49ers-Seahawks game.

2013

*Packers-Giants game was flexed out for the Chiefs-Broncos game. 
**Falcons-Packers game was flexed out for the Panthers-Saints game. 
***Patriots-Ravens game was flexed out for the Bears-Eagles game.

2014

Starting in the 2014 season, NBC was allowed to flex games beginning in week 5. All the previous flexible scheduling rules apply but on a limited basis.  Only two games between weeks 5–10 could be flexed per season; weeks 11–17 (excluding Thanksgiving Night) flex rules were still the same as in previous years.  However, despite these changes, NBC did not flex a single one of their originally scheduled games, which marked the first season that none of the originally scheduled Sunday night games for the entire season (other than week 17) were flexed out. NBC held the rights to broadcast one Wild Card game and one Divisional game in the playoffs as opposed to two Wild Card games. This would last through  in which the playoffs were contested amongst 12 teams.

2015

2015 marked the 10th season of SNF on NBC.

*Chiefs-Chargers game was flexed out for the Bengals-Cardinals game.
**Seahawks-Ravens game was flexed out for the Patriots-Texans game.
***Bengals-49ers game was flexed out for the Cardinals-Eagles game.
****Steelers-Ravens game was flexed out for the Giants-Vikings game.

2016

2016 marked the first-ever tie on NBC Sunday Night Football, which occurred in week 7, when the Seattle Seahawks and Arizona Cardinals tied at 6–6. That game became the lowest scoring SNF on NBC game (12 points) and the first tie in any primetime NFL game since November 23, 1997, when the New York Giants and Washington Redskins tied at 7–7 on ESPN Sunday Night Football. Due to NBC having the rights to the second half of the Thursday Night Football package, NBC Sports gave Al Michaels a "Bye week", giving him 3 games off: Green Bay Packers–Washington Redskins, Pittsburgh Steelers–Indianapolis Colts (Thanksgiving), and Kansas City Chiefs-Denver Broncos. Mike Tirico replaced him for three games, with Cris Collinsworth still doing the color commentary.

The AFC Divisional Playoff game between the Pittsburgh Steelers and the Kansas City Chiefs was originally scheduled to kickoff at 1:05 ET, but due to stormy weather in the Kansas City area, the NFL moved the kickoff time to 8:20 ET.

*Patriots–Jets game was flexed out for the Chiefs–Broncos game.
**Steelers–Bengals game was flexed out for the Buccaneers–Cowboys game.

2017
2017 marked the 12th season of NBC Sunday Night Football. Due to Christmas Eve falling on a Sunday in 2017, the Week 16 Sunday night telecast was instead scheduled for Saturday, December 23, with the Minnesota Vikings visiting the Green Bay Packers. NBC also broadcast Super Bowl LII, played at U.S. Bank Stadium in Minneapolis, making it the fourth time NBC had broadcast a Super Bowl since taking over the Sunday night package in 2006. NBC did not flex a single one of their originally scheduled games, which marked the second time since 2014 that none of the originally scheduled Sunday night games for the entire season were flexed out.  For the first time since acquiring the Sunday night package, NBC aired no game in Week 17 to ensure that teams whose games would affect each other's playoff standings would be played at the same time. The Atlanta Falcons-Los Angeles Rams NFC wild card game kicked off at 8:15 pm ET, while the NFC Divisional Playoff Game between the Atlanta Falcons and Philadelphia Eagles kicked off at 4:35 pm ET.

2018
Starting in 2018, the NFL moved the start time of Sunday Night Football back, from 8:30 p.m. ET to 8:20 p.m. ET. The Cincinnati Bengals–Kansas City Chiefs game flexed into Sunday Night on October 21 became the earliest the NFL has ever flexed a Sunday Night Football contest. The Atlanta Falcons–New Orleans Saints game on Thanksgiving night was called by the Football Night in America studio crew, with Mike Tirico doing the play-by-play, and Tony Dungy and Rodney Harrison as color analysts.  The Philadelphia Eagles–Chicago Bears Wild Card game kicked off at 4:35 p.m. ET, as did the Indianapolis Colts–Kansas City Chiefs Divisional game.

*Rams–49ers game was flexed out for the Bengals–Chiefs game.
**Steelers–Jaguars game was flexed out for the Vikings–Bears game.
***49ers–Seahawks game was flexed out for the Chargers–Steelers game.
****Steelers–Raiders game was flexed out for the Rams–Bears game.

2019
For the 2019 season, the NFL decided to break with a long-standing tradition of the reigning Super Bowl champion hosting the Kickoff game (occurring every year since 2004, except 2013). The Green Bay Packers and Chicago Bears was the Kickoff game instead, to celebrate the 100th season of the NFL, the 100th season of the Chicago Bears, and the NFL's oldest rivalry. Also, despite not hosting the kickoff game, the defending Super Bowl champion New England Patriots still hosted the first Sunday Night game of the season, with the opponent being the Pittsburgh Steelers.  The schedule also included a rematch of the Thanksgiving game between the New Orleans Saints and Atlanta Falcons, and the Cleveland Browns made their first SNF appearance since 2008. In Week 15, the Buffalo Bills were flexed to SNF in a game against the Pittsburgh Steelers; this was just their second appearance on the package, the first being in 2007. The Seattle Seahawks–Philadelphia Eagles Wild Card Playoff game kicked off at 4:40 pm ET, while the Divisional game between the Minnesota Vikings and San Francisco 49ers kicked off at 4:35 pm ET.

*Seahawks–Eagles game was flexed out for the Packers–49ers game.
**Vikings–Chargers game was flexed out for the Bills–Steelers game.

2020s

2020

2020 marked the 15th season of SNF on NBC. Super Bowl LV was originally supposed to air on NBC. However, in an effort to pair NBC’s next Super Bowl with their upcoming Olympics broadcast, it was traded to CBS, in exchange for Super Bowl LVI. NBC did however gain rights to air an extra Super Wild Card game, as the NFL expanded their postseason from 12 teams to 14 teams (7 in each conference). This meant that NBC aired two Super Wild Card games, with the second game being aired on NBC’s Spanish sister network Telemundo, and was streamed on NBCUniversal’s new streaming service Peacock, and one Divisional game for the 2020-2021 postseason. 

The SNF game scheduled for October 25 was originally Buccaneers-Raiders, but due to some Raiders players testing positive for COVID-19, the NFL moved that game back to 4:05 ET on Fox, and moved the Seahawks-Cardinals game to fill the SNF slot, to ensure that NBC would have a game. NBC's Thanksgiving night game between the Baltimore Ravens and the Pittsburgh Steelers had to be postponed twice due to a COVID-19 outbreak on the Ravens; The game was first rescheduled to the following Sunday at 1:15 PM ET, then later rescheduled to the following Tuesday at 8:00 PM ET, and finally rescheduled to the following Wednesday at 3:40 PM ET, still aired on NBC. 

In Week 15, the 49ers–Cowboys game was flexed out for Browns–Giants, marking the first time that the Dallas Cowboys have been flexed out of an SNF slot and the first time Sunday Night Football was not in Dallas at least once in a season (they have had the most appearances with 49). This was also the first time since 2012 that did not feature Indianapolis Colts.

*Buccaneers–Raiders game was flexed out for the Seahawks–Cardinals game.
**Ravens-Steelers game was postponed from Thursday, November 26 (Thanksgiving).
***49ers–Cowboys game was flexed out for the Browns–Giants game.

2021
The NFL expanded the season to 17 games in 18 weeks beginning with the 2021 season. 2021 also marked the 16th season of Sunday Night Football on NBC. Super Bowl LVI aired on February 13. After streaming NBC’s Sunday Night Wild Card Game last season, and as part of their new television deal with the NFL, NBC streamed the entire season on Peacock for the first time. Along with Peacock’s expanded involvement in the new television deal, NBC retained the rights to air SNF, while gaining an additional game for Peacock, and picking up 3 additional Super Bowls in 2026, 2030, and 2034 (all Winter Olympic years).
 

*49ers–Seahawks game was flexed out for the Broncos–Chiefs game.

2022

2022 marked the 17th season of Sunday Night Football on NBC.

*Bengals–Steelers game was flexed out for the Chiefs–Chargers game. **Chiefs–Broncos game was flexed out for the Dolphins–Chargers game. ***Patriots–Raiders game was flexed out for the Giants–Commanders game ****Rams–Chargers game was flexed out for the Steelers–Ravens game

2023

Sunday Night Football will return in 2023

SNF statistics

Most points scored on SNF by a single team: 62 (New Orleans Saints 62 vs. Indianapolis Colts 7 [10/23/2011])
Highest combined score on SNF: 83 points (Philadelphia Eagles 45 @ New York Giants 38 [12/13/2009] & Kansas City Chiefs 40 @ New England Patriots 43 [10/14/2018])
Lowest combined score on SNF: 9 points (New Orleans Saints 9 @ Tampa Bay Buccaneers 0 [12/19/2021])
Most appearances on SNF (counting postseason): 57 (Dallas Cowboys)
Fewest appearances on SNF (counting postseason): 4 (Jacksonville Jaguars)
Most wins on SNF (counting postseason): 30 (Dallas Cowboys)
Most losses on SNF (counting postseason): 27 (Dallas Cowboys)

 Washington appeared as the Washington Redskins until 2020 and the Washington Football Team until 2022
 Las Vegas appeared as the Oakland Raiders until 2020
 LA Chargers appeared as the San Diego Chargers until 2017
 LA Rams appeared as the St. Louis Rams until 2016

Most frequent matchups
Postseason matchups in italics.
Meetings across a number of years represents one regular season meeting per season.

See also
NFL on NBC
NFL on television
NBC Sunday Night Football
Thursday Night Football results (2006—present)
NFL Network Specials results (2006—present)
Monday Night Football results (1970–1989)
Monday Night Football results (1990–2009)
Monday Night Football results (2010–present)
ESPN Sunday Night Football results (1987–2005)
TNT Sunday Night Football results (1990–1997)

References
NBC Sunday Night Football Official Website

Sunday Night Football
Sunday Night Football results (2006-present)
National Football League lists
National Football League on television results